

369001–369100 

|-id=088
| 369088 Marcus ||  || Ella Marcus (1909–1982) was a Romanian astronomer who studied at the University of Bucharest and the Sorbonne. || 
|}

369101–369200 

|-id=134
| 369134 Mariareiche ||  || Maria Reiche (1903–1998) was a German-born Peruvian scientist who studied the Nazca Lines of Peru. Her life's work was documenting and protecting the lines, as well as disseminating information about them. || 
|}

369201–369300 

|-id=297
| 369297 Nazca ||  || The Nazca Lines are a series of ancient geoglyphs, located in the Nazca Desert of Peru. Created between 500 BCE and 500 CE, the site was designated as a UNESCO World Heritage Site in 1994. || 
|}

369301–369400 

|-bgcolor=#f2f2f2
| colspan=4 align=center | 
|}

369401–369500 

|-id=423
| 369423 Quintegr'al ||  || Quintegr'al is a brass quintet established by five students of the Paris Conservatoire National Supérieur de Musique et de Danse in 2012. It consists of Guillaume Fattet (trumpet), Fabien Verwaerde (trumpet), Guillaume Merlin (French horn), Nicolas Cunin (trombone) and Florian Schuegraf (tuba). || 
|}

369501–369600 

|-bgcolor=#f2f2f2
| colspan=4 align=center | 
|}

369601–369700 

|-bgcolor=#f2f2f2
| colspan=4 align=center | 
|}

369701–369800 

|-bgcolor=#f2f2f2
| colspan=4 align=center | 
|}

369801–369900 

|-bgcolor=#f2f2f2
| colspan=4 align=center | 
|}

369901–370000 

|-bgcolor=#f2f2f2
| colspan=4 align=center | 
|}

References 

369001-370000